Local elections took place on 3 October 2010 to elect mayors and the composition of municipal bodies of Hungary's 3,176 settlements. Voters also elected the total of 424 members of the county assemblies and the General Assembly of Hungary, besides 16,914 local government representatives.

Results

Budapest

Mayor

General Assembly

Districts of Budapest
Source

Towns with county rights
Source

County assemblies

See also
 2010 Hungarian parliamentary election

Notes

References

2010 elections in Europe
2010 in Hungary
Local elections in Hungary